The virginal, or virginals, is a keyboard instrument.

Virginal may also refer to:

Virginity, the state of a person who has never engaged in sexual intercourse
Virginal (poem), an anonymous Middle High German poem
"Virginal" (song), by Shouta Aoi, 2014

See also
Virgin (disambiguation)
Virginity (disambiguation)